Leucinodes laisalis is a species of moth in the family Crambidae.

The wingspan is 20–34 mm. Females are somewhat larger. The forewing ground colour ranges from orange to grey brown.

Distribution 

It is mainly distributed in Africa, where it is known Côte d’Ivoire, the Gambia, Ghana, Kenya, Morocco, Niger, Nigeria, Réunion, Senegal, South Africa, Tanzania. It has also been recorded from Belgium, Spain, Portugal and the United Kingdom, which probably do not represent native occurrences of the species but rather unintended introductions along with imports of tomatoes and other Solanaceae, the species' host plants.

Larval food plants 

The larvae exclusively feed on the fruits of Solanaceae. Their recorded host plants are Solanum anguivi, Solanum incanum, Solanum linnaeanum, Solanum macrocarpon, Solanum melongenum, Lycopersicon esculentum and Capsicum annuum.

References

Spilomelinae
Moths described in 1859
Moths of Africa
Moths of Réunion